Chichester is a cathedral city in West Sussex, England. The following is a list of those people who were either born or live in Chichester, or had some important contribution to make to the town.

Notable people from Chichester


A
 Alan Arnell (1935–2013) - association football player
 Isabel Ashdown (born 1970) - author

B
 Alan Badel (1923–1982) - actor
 Peter Baldwin (1933–2015) - actor
 Harriet Barber (1968–2014) - painter
 Roland Beamont (1920–2001) - RAF fighter pilot ace World War II
 Geoffrey Beevers (1941- ) - actor
 John Blund  (c. 1175 – 1248) - philosopher
 Tommy Boyd (born 1952) - radio presenter
 Vic Buckingham (1915–1995) - association football player
 Cordelia Bugeja (born 1976) - actress
 John Bullokar (1574–1627) - physician and lexicographer
 John William Burgon (1813 – 1888) - Dean of Chichester beginning in 1876, notable defender of Biblical inerrancy.

C
 John Cameron (1914–2000) - cricketer
 William Cawley (1602–1667) - politician; signatory to death warrant of King Charles I
 William Chillingworth (1602–1644) - churchman
 Tiberius Claudius Cogidubnus - local ruler in Roman Britain
 William Clowes (1779–1847) - printer
 William Collins (1721–1759) - poet.
 Holly Colvin (born 1989) - cricketer
 F.W.S. Craig (1929–1989) - psephologist
 Richard Cudmore (1787–1840) - violinist
 Vincent Cushing (born 1950) - cricketer

D
 Norman Demuth (1878–1968) - composer
 Hugh Dennis (born 1962) - comedian, writer, actor

E
 Jack Maynard Cholmondeley Easton (1906–1984) - RNVR holder of George Cross
 Harvey Lonsdale Elmes (1813–1847) - architect
 Michael Elphick (1946–2002) - actor
 David Emms (1925–2015) - rugby union player and educationalist

F
 Justin Fitzpatrick (born 1973) - rugby union player and Major League Rugby coach
 John Forbes (1787–1861) - physician
 Mike Friday (born 1972) - rugby union player and coach
 Christopher Fry (1907–2005) - playwright
 J.F.C. Fuller (1878–1966) - Army officer (major-general) and historian

G
 Edric Frederick Gifford, 3rd Baron Gifford (1849–1911) - holder of the Victoria Cross
 Eric Gill (1882–1940) - sculptor, typeface designer and printmaker
 William Greenfield (died 1315) - Dean of Chichester
 Harry Gregson-Williams (born 1961) - composer, orchestrator, conductor, and music producer
 Rupert Gregson-Williams (born 1966) - composer

H
 Jamie Hall (born 1968) - cricketer
 Lisa Hammond (actress), born 1983
 Ian Hannah (1874–1944) - academic, writer,  politician
 Edward Hardwicke (1932–2011) - actor
 Charles Harington (1872–1940) - Army officer in World War I
 Edward Harrison (1910–2002) - cricketer and squash player
 Charlotte Hawkins (born 1975) - Sky News presenter
 Giles Haywood (born 1979) - former Sussex and Nottinghamshire cricketer
 Sean Heather (born 1982) - cricketer
 Antony Hegarty (born 1971) - singer
 George Hersee (1924–2001) - BBC engineer
 Andrew Hodd (born 1984) - cricketer
 Alex Horne (born 1978) - comedian
 Brian Horrocks (1895–1985) - Lt General, World War II; BBC presenter
 Charlie Howard (1854–1929) - cricketer
 Jim Howick (born 1979) - comedian and writer
 William Huskisson (1783–1828) - politician; killed in an early railway accident 
 Walter Hussey (1909–1985) - Dean of Chichester Cathedral

J
 William Juxon (1582–1663) - Archbishop of Canterbury

K
Joseph Kelway (c. 1702–1782)- Harpsichordist, Organist Composer
Jarvis Kenrick (1852–1949) - association football player
 Edward Knapp-Fisher (1915–2003) - bishop

L
 Jennifer Lash (1939–1993) - novelist and painter
 Margaret Leighton (1922–1976) - actress
 Lord Henry Lennox (1821–1886) - politician
 Morgan Lewington - Canadian TV and film producer
 James Lillywhite (1842–1929) - English cricketer
 Ian Lloyd (1921–2006) - politician
 George Long (1800–1879) - English classical scholar
 Robert Ballard Long (1771–1825) - Army officer
 Walter Loveys (1920–1969) - politician and farmer

M
 Morris Maddocks (1928–2008) - bishop
 Charlotte Mardyn (1789-after 1844) - actress
 Leslie Evershed Martin (1903–1991) - theatrical impresario and mayor of Chichester
 Charlotte Mason (1842–1923) - educator
 Stephen Matthews (born 1946) - Australian author and publisher
 Jasper Mayne (1604–1672) - Archdeacon of Chichester
 Cursor Miner - musician
 Kate Mosse (born 1961) - author, playwright and broadcaster

N
 Ralph Neville (died 1244) - Bishop of Chichester and Lord Chancellor of England
 Adrian Noble (born 1950) - theatre director

O
 Tom Odell (born 1990) - singer-songwriter; winner of the 2013 Critics' Choice BRIT Award

P
 Abraham Pether (1756-1812) - painter
 Timothy Peake (born 1972) - astronaut
 Edward Schroeder Prior (1857–1932) - architect; Arts and Craft Movement 
 Mavis Pugh (1914–2006) - actress

R
 Zoe Rahman - jazz pianist
 Leslie Rands (1900–1972) - opera singer
 Mark Roberts (born 1961) - archaeologist
 Anita Roddick (1942–2007) - founder of The Body Shop
 Dame Patricia Routledge (born 1929) - theatre, television, and film actress; singer

S
 James Saxon (1954–2003) - actor
 Richard Seaman (1913–1939) - Grand Prix driver
 John Selden (1584–1654) - jurist
 M.P. Shiel (1865–1947) - fantasy fiction writer
 Ros Simmons - CEO of Vie at Home
 Dudley Smith (born 1926) - politician
 George Smith (1713/14–1776) - landscape painter
 Edward Speleers (born 1988) - actor
 Paul Steinitz (1909–1988) - musician
 Edward Story (died 1503) - bishop
 Charles Sutton (1891–1962) - cricketer

T
 Frederick Tees - member of the Dam Busters raid during Operation Chastise
 Dave Thomas (born 1950) - association football player; PE teacher
 James Tighe - professional wrestler

V 
 Herbert Vivian (1865–1940) – writer, journalist and newspaper proprietor

W
 Honeysuckle Weeks (born 1979) - actress
 Perdita Weeks (born 1985) - actress
 Rollo Weeks (born 1987) - actor
 George Weldon (1908–1963) - conductor
 John Weldon (1676–1736) - composer
 Simon of Wells (died 1207) - Bishop of Chichester
 Michael Wilding (1912–1979) - actor

References

 
Chichester